Montenegro competed at the 2014 Winter Olympics in Sochi, Russia from 7 to 23 February 2014. The team consisted of two athletes competing in alpine skiing and for the first time a female athlete.

Competitors

Alpine skiing 

According to the quota allocation released on January 20, 2014, Montenegro has two athletes in qualification position.

References

External links 
Montenegro at the 2014 Winter Olympics 

Nations at the 2014 Winter Olympics
2014
2014 in Montenegrin sport